Gahnia setifolia, commonly known as mapere, gahnia, giant gahnia, or razor sedge is a native sedge of New Zealand. It is found throughout the North Island and top of the South Island of New Zealand.

References

setifolia
Flora of New Zealand
Plants described in 1864